The tundra wolf (Canis lupus albus), also known as the Turukhan wolf, is a subspecies of grey wolf native to Eurasia's tundra and forest-tundra zones from Finland to the Kamchatka Peninsula. It was first described in 1792 by Robert Kerr, who described it as living around the Yenisei, and of having a highly valued pelt.

Description
Although often written to be larger than C. l. lupus, this is untrue, as heavier members of the latter subspecies have been recorded. The highest weight recorded among 500 wolves caught in the Taymyr Peninsula and the Kanin Peninsula during 1951-1961 was from an old male killed on the Taymyr at the north of the Dudypta River weighing . The fur is very long, dense, fluffy, and soft, and is usually light grey in colour. The lower fur is lead-grey and the upper fur is reddish-grey.

Habitat
The tundra wolf generally rests in river valleys, thickets and forest clearings. In winter it feeds almost exclusively on female or young wild and domestic reindeer, though hares, arctic foxes and other animals are sometimes targeted. The stomach contents of 74 wolves caught in the Nenets Autonomous Okrug in the 1950s were found to consist of 93.1% reindeer remains. In the summer period, tundra wolves feed extensively on birds and small rodents, as well as newborn reindeer calves.

References

Mammals of Russia
Carnivorans of Europe
Subspecies of Canis lupus
Mammals of the Arctic
Mammals described in 1792
Fauna of Siberia